The Long Journey Home may refer to:

 The Long Journey Home (ceremonial event)
 Long Journey Home (Live in Liverpool), 2006 live album by Cowboy Junkies
 The Long Journey Home (1987 film)
 The Long Journey Home (2009 film)
 The Long Journey Home (video game), 2017

See also 
 The Irish in America: Long Journey Home